Teen Titans Go! vs. Teen Titans is a direct-to-video animated superhero film, and a crossover between the television series Teen Titans Go! and the original Teen Titans, both of which are adapted from the DC Comics superhero team of the same name. It is also the second Teen Titans Go! movie, after Teen Titans Go! To the Movies. Warner Bros. announced that a crossover featuring the two teams was being made at Comic-Con on July 21, 2019, followed by a digital release on September 24, then followed by a DVD and Blu-ray release on October 15. The events of the film take place during the fifth season of Teen Titans Go! and after the finale of the fifth season of Teen Titans and its TV film sequel Teen Titans: Trouble in Tokyo. The film premiered on television on Cartoon Network on February 17, 2020.

The film received generally positive reviews from critics.

This was the final film appearance of Robert Morse before his death in 2022.

Plot
The Teen Titans Go! team are battling the Gentleman Ghost as he attempts to rob a bank. He manages to possess Robin and then Starfire, but when attempting the same trick on Raven, he unintentionally cracks her red Ajna chakra gemstone, which awakens her inner demon's dark power and results in his defeat. Trigon reveals that Raven's demonic-half is slowly taking over her and offers to take it away, but she refuses to give it to him.

Suddenly, the Titans are abducted by the Master of Games, a being who explores the multiverse with his Worlogog to find the best versions of particular heroes. He pits the 2013 Titans against the original 2003 animated Titans, who agree to fight after the Master of Games threatens to destroy their Earths. 2003 Robin and Cyborg manage to take out all of the 2013 Titans with the exception of Raven. She is coerced into unleashing her demonic power against the 2003 Raven, who snaps her out of it when she realizes the Master of Games is siphoning her demonic energy. The Master of Games then reveals himself to be 2013 Trigon, who uses Raven's energy to partially resurrect 2003 Trigon. The two Trigons kidnap the Ravens and escape to the 2003 Earth to finish absorbing 2013 Raven's dark demonic powers so they can conquer the multiverse.

The two Titans teams agree to work together to stop the Trigons and rescue their Ravens. 2003 Robin deduces that the Trigons are using a Worlogog from their Earth to travel between dimensions, so they need a Worlogog from the 2013 dimension, which the 2013 Titans realize belongs to Santa Claus. The two teams battle Santa and Mrs. Claus and escape by using the device to travel between dimensions and eventually make it to the 2003 Earth just after 2003 Trigon completely absorbs 2013 Raven's demonic powers. Fed up with his counterpart's insults, 2013 Trigon consumes 2003 Trigon and transforms into a new and very powerful being named Hexagon.

To combat this new threat, 2003 Robin uses their Worlogog to summon Titans teams throughout the multiverse to form the "Titans of Infinite Earths", but to no avail. 2013 Raven evens the odds by eating all of her counterparts and transforms into a black dragon known as "the Unkindness". The Titans destroy Trigon's Worlogog and assist Raven in getting all of her powers back, which sends 2003 Trigon into limbo while 2013 Robin uses their Worlogog to send 2013 Trigon to a zombie dimension.

After 2013 Raven accepts her innermost demon self, all of the Teen Titans are sent home to their respective dimensions. Upon returning to their Earth, the 2013 Titans express relief that they do not have to endure another multiverse-threatening crossover for at least another year. Just then, they are attacked by Darkseid, but refuse to battle him out of exhaustion.

In a post-credit scene, the 2013 Titans relax at their headquarters, ignoring Darkseid's attack upon Jump City.

Cast
 Greg Cipes as Beast Boy (Teen Titans Go!)/Beast Boy (Teen Titans)
 Rhys Darby as Master of Games
 Grey Griffin as Mrs. Claus/Bank Teller
 Sean Maher as Nightwing
 Scott Menville as Robin (Teen Titans Go!)/Robin (Teen Titans)
 Robert Morse as Santa Claus
 Khary Payton as Cyborg (Teen Titans Go!)/Cyborg (Teen Titans)
 Kevin Michael Richardson as Trigon (Teen Titans Go!)/Trigon (Teen Titans)/Hexagon
 Tara Strong as Raven (Teen Titans Go!)/Raven (Teen Titans)
 Hynden Walch as Starfire (Teen Titans Go!)/Starfire (Teen Titans) 
 "Weird Al" Yankovic as Gentleman Ghost/Darkseid

Characters that make silent appearances: various iterations of the Teen Titans from other dimensions, Terra, Batman, Silkie.

Release
The film premiered at the San Diego Comic-Con on July 21, 2019, followed by a digital release on September 24, and a DVD and Blu-ray release on October 15. It also premiered in India on October 22, 2022 in the form of The Teen Titans Specials on Cartoon Network.

Reception
The film has received positive reviews from critics. IGN gave the film an 8 out of 10 stating, "Another awesome animated effort from DC/Warner Bros., Teen Titans Go! vs. Teen Titans is a super fun film perfectly primed to debut at San Diego Comic Con. Filled with classic characters and fan-satisfying fun, this chaotic cartoon crossover is sure to delight even the crankiest Teen Titans fans and the cheekiest Teen Titans Go! diehards. Basically, no matter where you're entering this arena from you'll have a titanic good time as you join these two teams on a multiverse-hopping journey through time, space, and... Santa!"

CBR.com gave the film a positive review stating, "Teen Titans Go! vs. Teen Titans isn't the most revolutionary film ever, nor does it reach the truly ambitious scale that last year's Teen Titans Go! To the Movies or the thematically similar Spider-Man: Into the Spider-Verse managed to be. But as a love letter to the franchise that incorporates plenty of humor and heart, the new movie succeeds. The film proves that no matter what form they come in, the Teen Titans can have compelling and emotional stories, even amidst gags about superhumans fighting Santa's elves."

Fanbasepress awarded the film an overall positive, saying "All in all, this is a great movie that both kids and adults alike will love."

Teen Titans Go! vs. Teen Titans has earned $250,500 from domestic DVD sales and $450,484 from domestic Blu-ray sales, bringing its total domestic home video earnings to $700,984.

Future movies
Warner Bros. Animation released a third Teen Titans Go! film, Teen Titans Go! See Space Jam, where they crossover with Space Jam as a way to promote Space Jam: A New Legacy in 2021.

Warner Bros. Animation also released a fourth Teen Titans Go! film, Teen Titans Go! & DC Super Hero Girls: Mayhem in the Multiverse, where they crossover with DC Super Hero Girls.

References

External links

 DC page
 

2010s animated superhero films
2019 animated films
2019 films
2019 direct-to-video films
Animated superhero crossover films
Warner Bros. Animation animated films
Animated films about extraterrestrial life
Teen Titans
Animated teen superhero comedy films
Teen Titans films
Teen Titans Go! (film series)
Films about parallel universes
Anime-influenced Western animation
Demons in film
Santa Claus in film
American sequel films
2010s English-language films
2010s American films